Kirill Golosnitsky (born 30 May 1994) is a Russian rugby union player who generally plays as a wing represents Russia internationally.

He was included in the Russian squad for the 2019 Rugby World Cup which was held in Japan for the first time and also marks his first World Cup appearance.

Career 
He made his international debut for Russia against United States on 25 June 2016. He scored the first try of the 2019 Rugby World Cup in the tournament opener against hosts Japan in the fourth minute of the match which was held on 20 September 2019. The match also marked his first World Cup match appearance and Japan managed to defeat Russia despite conceding an early lead.

International Tries 
As of 10 August 2022

References 

Russian rugby union players
Russia international rugby union players
Living people
1994 births
Sportspeople from Moscow
Rugby union wings